Stehanja Vas is a small village in the Municipality of Trebnje in eastern Slovenia. It lies south of Veliki Gaber, south of the Slovenian A2 motorway. The area is part of the historical region of Lower Carniola. The municipality is now part of the Southeast Slovenia Statistical Region.

Name
Stehanja Vas was attested in historical sources in 1228 as Stoychornsdorf, in 1406 as Stocheindorff, and in 1460 as Stochendarff. The name of the village comes from the nickname Stehan, a contraction of *Stojehan, thus meaning 'Stehan's village', referring to an early inhabitant of the settlement.

Church

The local church, built north of the village, is dedicated to the Exaltation of the Holy Cross and belongs to the Parish of Šentlovrenc. It is a well-preserved example of Gothic architecture dating to the mid-15th century with few alterations.

References

External links

Stehanja Vas at Geopedia

Populated places in the Municipality of Trebnje